Forever is the fourth studio album by American singer Bobby Brown. The album's only single, "Feelin' Inside" (music video directed by Scott Kalvert), failed to impact the charts.

Background
The album was recorded after Brown left New Edition's Home Again tour in 1997. Prior to the New Edition reunion, Brown was the original choice to play Powerline in Walt Disney Pictures's animated movie, A Goofy Movie, but was cut due to drug problems and was replaced by R&B singer Tevin Campbell. Some of the songs Bobby did for the movie's soundtrack were revamped and included on Forever.
The album was originally titled Bobby II, and was supposed to be produced by veterans of the genre Teddy Riley, Sean Combs, R. Kelly and Jimmy Jam & Terry Lewis.

Track listing
Credits adapted from liner notes and Allmusic

Charts

References

1997 albums
Bobby Brown albums
Albums produced by Tim & Bob
MCA Records albums